Croquette is a 1927 French silent film directed by Louis Mercanton and starring Betty Balfour, Walter Byron and Nicolas Koline.

Cast
 Betty Balfour as Croquette  
 Walter Byron as Bob  
 Nicolas Koline as Morton  
 Rachel Devirys as Lola Morelli  
 Louis Baron fils as L'Indendant Blomart 
 Ernest Chambery as Monsieur Pluche, le pharmacien  
 Futelais as Clown  
 Madeleine Guitty as Madame Tromboli  
 Bonaventura Ibáñez as Le Duc de Valdomme 
 Jean Mercanton as Dickie  
 Bob O'Connor as Clown  
 Albert Rancy as Jose

References

Bibliography
 Goble, Alan. The Complete Index to Literary Sources in Film. Walter de Gruyter, 1999.

External links

1927 films
Films directed by Louis Mercanton
French silent feature films
French black-and-white films
Pathé films
1920s French films